is a malevolent figure in Japanese urban legends and folklore. Described as the malicious spirit, or onryō, of a woman, she partially covers her face with a mask or other item and carries a pair of scissors, a knife, or some other sharp object. She is most often described as having long, straight, black hair, pale skin, and otherwise being considered beautiful (except for her scar).
She has been described as a contemporary yōkai.

According to popular legend, she asks potential victims if they think she is beautiful. If they respond with "no", she will either kill them with her long medical scissors on the spot or wait until nightfall and murder them in their sleep. If they say "yes", she will reveal that the corners of her mouth are slit from ear to ear, and she will then repeat her question. If the individual responds with "no", she will kill them with her weapon, and if they say "yes" hesitantly she will cut the corners of their mouth in such a way that resembles her own disfigurement. Methods that can be used to survive an encounter with Kuchisake-onna include answering her question by describing her appearance as "average", or by distracting her with money or hard candies.

The Kuchisake-onna legend has been described as dating back to the 17th to 19th centuries, during Japan's Edo period. The story experienced a resurgence of awareness in 1970s Japan, when several newspapers and magazines reported on the legend and rumors surrounding it spread throughout the country, leading to young children being accompanied by groups of adults while walking home from school.

The legend and its variations

According to legend, Kuchisake-onna was a woman who was mutilated during her life, with her mouth being slit from ear to ear. In some versions of the story, Kuchisake-onna was the adulterous wife or a mistress of a samurai during her life. She grew lonely as the samurai would always be away from home fighting, because of this she would begin to have affairs with men around the town. When the samurai heard of this he was outraged. As punishment for her infidelity, her husband sliced the corners of her mouth from ear to ear. Other versions of the tale include that her mouth was mutilated during a medical or dental procedure, that she was mutilated by a woman who was jealous of her beauty, or that her mouth is filled with numerous sharp teeth.

After her death, the woman returned as a vengeful spirit, or onryō. As an onryō, she covers her mouth with a cloth mask (often specified as a surgical mask), or in some iterations, a hand fan or handkerchief. She carries a sharp instrument with her, which has been described as a knife, a machete, a scythe, or a large pair of scissors. She is also described as having supernatural speed. She is said to ask potential victims if they think she is attractive, often phrased as "Watashi, kirei?" (which translates to "Am I pretty?" or "Am I beautiful?"). If the person answers "no", she will kill the person with her weapon, and if the person answers "yes", she will reveal her mutilated mouth. She then repeats her question (or asks "Kore demo?", which translates to "Even with this?" or "Even now?") and if the person responds with "no" or screams in fright, she will kill the person with her weapon. If the response is "yes", she will slice the corners of the person's mouth from ear to ear, resembling her own disfigurement.

An individual can survive an encounter with Kuchisake-onna by using one of several methods. In some versions of the legend, Kuchisake-onna will leave the potential victim alone if they answer "yes" to both of her questions, though in other versions, she will visit the individual's residence later that night and murder the person while sleeping. Other survival tactics include replying to Kuchisake-onna's question by describing her appearance as "average", giving the individual enough time to run away; distracting her by giving or throwing money or hard candies (particularly the kind of candy known as bekko ame, made of caramelised sugar) in her direction, as she will stop to pick them up; or by saying the word "pomade" three times.

History
Author and folklorist Matthew Meyer has described the Kuchisake-onna legend as having roots dating back to Japan's Edo period, which spanned from the 17th to 19th centuries.

In print, the legend of Kuchisake-onna dates back to at least as early as 1979. The legend was reported in such publications as the Gifu Prefecture newspaper Gifu Nichi Nichi Shinbun on 26 January 1979, the weekly publication Shukan Asahi on 23 March 1979, and the weekly news magazine Shukan Shincho on 5 April 1979. Rumors about Kuchisake-onna spread throughout Japan, which led to young children sometimes being accompanied by members of parent–teacher association groups while walking home from school.

Historian and manga author Shigeru Mizuki considered Kuchisake-onna to be an example of a yōkai, a term which can refer to a variety of supernatural monsters, spirits, and demons in Japanese folklore. According to Zack Davisson, a translator of many of Mizuki's works, "When Mizuki put her in one of his newest yokai encyclopedias, that's when she was officially considered a yokai."

In popular culture
Kuchisake-onna has appeared in live-action films, as well as in the manga, anime, and video games. The character appears in the 1994 animated film Pom Poko, produced by Studio Ghibli, and later appears in the 1996 live-action short film Kuchisake-onna, directed by Teruyoshi Ishii. She is also mentioned in the 1998 film Ring, directed by Hideo Nakata. In 2007, the film Carved: The Slit-Mouthed Woman (also known under the titles Kuchisake-onna or A Slit-Mouthed Woman), directed by Kōji Shiraishi and featuring Miki Mizuno as Kuchisake-onna, was released. The film was followed by Carved 2: The Scissors Massacre (also known as Kuchisake-onna 2) and The Slit-Mouthed Woman 0: The Beginning (or Kuchisake-onna 0: Biginingu), both of which were released in 2008. The Kuchisake-onna character later appeared in the 2012 film Kuchisake-onna Returns, as well as in the webcomic Mob Psycho 100.

Kuchisake-onna was also the basis for a character that appears in the episode "Danse Vaudou" of the American television series Constantine.

See also
 Bloody Mary, an urban legend about a demonic apparition who appears in mirrors
 Japanese urban legends, enduring modern Japanese folktales
 La Llorona, the ghost of a woman in Latin American folklore
 Madam Koi Koi, an African urban legend about the ghost of a dead teacher
 Ouni, a Japanese yōkai with a face like that of a demon woman (kijo) torn from mouth to ear
 Teke Teke, a Japanese urban legend about the spirit of a girl with no legs

References

Sources

Further reading

External links
 Kuchisake-onna 
 Tales of Ghostly Japan, Japanzine
 Histoire de Kuchisake Onna 

Yōkai
Japanese ghosts
Japanese folklore
Japanese urban legends

Female legendary creatures